Rampage is the official mascot of the Los Angeles Rams of the National Football League (NFL). Introduced in July 2010, he is an anthropomorphic ram who wears a Rams jersey like the rest of the team.  He wears the number one (#1).

Background

Naming Rampage
His name was selected by fans who voted in an online mascot-naming contest; "Rampage" was officially announced as the winning name at the St. Louis Zoo's south entrance on July 26, 2010. More than 1,000 names were submitted for the mascot. The top vote receivers were Rampage, Archie, Ramsey, Rammer, and Rush, respectively. The person who submitted the winning name won a suite at a Rams game for themselves and fifteen friends, a Ram's jersey, and a two hundred dollar gift card to the Official Rams online store. The winning name was submitted by Chris Shaffer. The Shaffer family was present for the unveiling of Rampage at the St. Louis Zoo.

Rationale

According to Kevin Demoff, the Rams' current executive-vice president of football operations, Rampage "has the coating of a stuffed animal, but the build of a superhero." Ram's ownership says that Rampage will make around 300 appearances a year from games to charity events and parties. Demoff says, "The organization decided to add a mascot to build game day entertainment and to make more involvement possible in the community." The team's plan is to have Rampage be part of the rebirth process of the team and to help bring the team a more distinguishable identity.

Biography
Rampage stands 6'1" and tips the scales at 200 lbs. He can often be found roaming the sidelines of home games at the SoFi Stadium. Although a ram, he is known for his friendly demeanor and childlike antics. Home and opposing fans tend to find Rampage both friendly and approachable. When not at games, Rampage is typically found taking part in various initiatives across Los Angeles.

Previous Mascots
Since the Rams started out as an organization in 1937, they have called three cities home. Their club has been based in Cleveland, Los Angeles, and St. Louis before returning to Los Angeles in 2016. In their 73 years of existence and their three home cities, they have only ever had one mascot before 2010. The mascot was a furry creature that resembled a rat more than anything and was named Ramster in the mid-1990s. The fans, however, never really took to Ramster and he was terminated in 1996.

Accolades
 1x Super Bowl champion (Super Bowl LVI)
 6x NFL Pro Bowl Mascot
 2x Super Bowl Appearance (Super Bowl LIII, Super Bowl LVI)
 3x NFC West Division Champion
 2x NFC Champion

On July 22, 2010, Rampage threw the ceremonial first pitch at the St. Louis Cardinals' baseball game at Busch Stadium.

Rampage has attended the Pro Bowl three times in 2011, 2013 and 2015.  Despite only attending three, Rampage has been selected to five Pro Bowls since his debut.

References

Los Angeles Rams
National Football League mascots
Animal mascots
Mascots introduced in 2010